KKD Nagar, also known as Kaviyarasu Kannadasan Nagar named after the Tamil poet Kannadasan, is mainly a sub-residential locality of Kodungaiyur in the northern part of the metropolitan city of Chennai, Tamil Nadu state, India.

Location

KKD Nagar is located in North Chennai. National Highway 5 (NH 5) borders this area in south. 
It is 8 km from Chennai Central Railway Station. This place is near to the Grand Northern Trunk [GNT] road

Transport Services

The bus services from/via  Kaviarasu Kannadasan Nagar (KKD Nagar) bus terminal are:

Kodungaiyur P6 Police Station and Electricity board office is situated on Sidco Main Road.

Schools and Colleges
KKD Nagar and its surrounding has a number of educational institutions catering to the residents of the area. Most notable ones are 
 Sree Muthukumaraswamy College, Muthamizh Nagar Church
 Thiruthangal Nadar College, Selavayal
 Dr. Ambedkar Government Arts and Science College, Vyasarpadi
 Sacred Heart Matriculation Higher Secondary School, Muthamizh Nagar
 St.Joseph's Matriculation Higher Secondary School, Seetharam Nagar
 Government High school, in K.K.D Nagar
 Don Bosco Matriculation Higher secondary school, KKD Nagar, Erukkancherry, MKB Nagar
 Sri Sayee Vivekananda Higher Secondary School, Muthamil Nagar
 Gurumoorthy High school
 FES Matriculation Higher secondary school, Muthamil Nagar
 Our Lady's Matriculation Higher Secondary School, M.R Nagar
 Velankani Matriculation Higher Secondary School, Muthamil Nagar
 Smt. N.D.J.A Vivekananda vidyalaya junior college (CBSC)
 Lakshmi Narayana Matriculation school, Selavayal
 Bharathi Nursery & Primary School, Block V, KKD Nagar
 Mother Therasa Matriculation Higher Secondary School, KKD Nagar
 Bharathi Nursery & Primary School, Block I, Muthamil Nagar
 CSI Bain Matriculation Higher Secondary School, Muthamil Nagar
 Radha Krishnan Matriculation Higher secondary school, Krishnamoorthy Nagar

Community Hall

The Community halls located in KKD Nagar include:

 Seetha Ram Nagar Telugu People Welfare Association, Seetha Ram Nagar
 Malaysia Mahal, Ethirajsamy salai, M.R. Nagar
 A.B.Maaligai, Chinna kodungaiyur
 Malathy Mahal, Muthamil Nagar
 Eswari Mahal, Erukkancherry
 Raj Hall, Sidco Main Road. KKD Nagar
 Dana Bhackiyam Hall, Meenambal Salai, Vivekananda Nagar
 S.K Mahal, Meenambal Salai, Vivekananda Nagar
 Balaji Kalyana Mandapam, Kodungaiyur
 Burma Mahal, Thiruthangal college Road, Selavayal
 Indira Mahal, Ethirajsamy salai, M.R. Nagar
 K.S. Mahal, M.R. Nagar
 G.R Kalyana Mandapam, Kodungaiyur
 R R Mahal, Muthamil Nagar
 S.M Mahal, M.R.Nagar

Surroundings

Neighbourhoods in Chennai